In Miracle Land is the seventh studio album by Australian alternative rock band The Vines. It was released on 29 June 2018 and was the band's second release under their own label Wicked Nature Music.

Background
On 25 March 2016, the band posted a picture of Craig Nicholls in the studio playing guitar with the caption "Album #7 coming soon..." on their Facebook page. On 1 April 2016, the first single "In Miracle Land" was released.

In October 2016, the band played three shows in Australia for the 'In Miracle Land' Tour. During the tour, the band debuted new songs "Hate the Sound", "I Wanna Go Down", "Broken Heart", "Sky Gazer" and "Gone Wonder".

On 31 May 2018, it was announced via Facebook that the album In Miracle Land would be released 29 June 2018 and feature the same line-up as Wicked Nature.

In Miracle Land is the last album that was recorded with Tim John and Lachlan West. Right after the tour to promote the album, Craig Nicholls fired them from the band. 

The album is the last album to date and the last one before going on an officially unannounced hiatus.

Reception
| rev1 = AllMusic
| rev1score =

Track listing

Personnel
 Craig Nicholls – vocals, guitar, piano
 Tim John – bass 
 Lachlan West – drums

References

The Vines (band) albums
2018 albums
Alternative rock albums by Australian artists
Garage rock albums by Australian artists
Post-grunge albums by Australian artists
Neo-psychedelia albums